Statements on Auditing Procedure were issued by the Committee on Auditing Procedure of AICPA from 1939 to 1972.  The Committee issued 54 SAPs before it became the Auditing Standards Executive Committee (AcSEC) and began issuing Statements on Auditing Standards.Statement on Auditing Standards No. 1 summarized and superseded the 54 SAPs.

List of Statements on Auditing Procedure

History of Statements on Auditing Procedure
The history of the Statements on Auditing Procedures began in 1917 when the American Institute of Accountants (the predecessor organization for the AICPA) was asked by the Federal Trade Commission to  prepare a "memorandum on balance-sheet audits." The resulting document was published in the April 1917 issue of the Federal Reserve Bulletin and reissued in 1918 as a pamphlet. In 1929 the pamphlet was again revised. A third revision was done in 1936. 

The Institute determined that, rather than reissuing the 1936 pamphlet, it would, through the Committee on Auditing Procedure, issue Statements on Auditing Procedure that modified and superseded parts of the 1936 pamphlet.  The SAPs were "designed to guide the auditor in those areas of specific situations encountered in practice in which he must exercise judgment, situations outside the realm of textbooks, whose function is inherently to describe procedures in general."  By 1948, the 1936 pamphlet was considered so out-of-date that it was withdrawn from publication.  

In 1951, the first 24 Statements on Auditing Procedure were codified   The Codification also contains a summary history of the process of standardizing auditing practice up to 1951 (see pp. 5–8).  

In 1954, the Committee on Auditing Procedure finished work on the booklet Generally Accepted Auditing Standards: Their Significance and Scope. This publication responded to the Securities and Exchange Commission's recommendation that the auditor's report make a representation as to compliance with generally accepted auditing standards.

Statement on Procedure no. 33 again codified previous Committee on Auditing Procedure publications, including the 1951 Codification, The 1954 Generally Accepted Auditing Standards, and Statements on Auditing Procedure 25-32.

The final publication of the Committee on Auditing procedure, Codification of Auditing Standards and Procedures 1, superseded SAPs 33-54. The Statement is now known as Statement on Auditing Standards, no. 1 and began a series of Statements on Auditing Standards (SASs) that are still being issued by the Auditing Standards Board. See Statements on Auditing Standards (USA).  Beginning in 1976, these Standards were codified annually as section AU of the AICPA's Professional Standards.''

References

External links 
 American Institute of Certified Public Accountants

Auditing standards
Auditing in the United States